Sid the Slug is an advertising character created by the Food Standards Agency (FSA) in the United Kingdom in 2004 as the mascot of the "Salt - Watch it" campaign to warn the public of the risks of excessive salt consumption.

The multimedia campaign, including advertising hoardings, television commercials and Internet coverage, was based on the premise that salt kills slugs, and can harm humans too. The Salt Manufacturers' Association filed a complaint to the Advertising Standards Authority, their complaint being that the information presented was misleading. The Advertising Standards Authority did not uphold the SMA complaint in its adjudication.

The ASA had to deal with another complaint from a member of the public, that the use of the name "Sid" was offensive; this was also rejected, with the ASA instead arguing that most people would find it "humorous".

A member of the public complained to the FSA that the Welsh subtitles in the "Sid the Slug" TV advertisements meant the FSA was not treating English and Welsh equally, as is required by the FSA Welsh Language Scheme. The FSA replied that the animation could not have been dubbed into Welsh successfully, hence the subtitles. However, the FSA accepted that it had not complied with advertising conduct, as set by the Welsh Language Board.

References

External links
 Sid the Slug game from the Food Standards Agency
 Salt Manufacturers' Association
 Salt Manufacturers' Association press release Sid the Slug slips up 18 October 2004
 BBC Salt firms complain over campaign 20 September 2004
 BBC Sid says salt stinks. Salt says same of Sid 23 September 2004
 Daily Telegraph (Dr James Le Fanu) In sickness and in health: take Sid the Slug's warning with a pinch of salt
 News-Medical.Net article on the SMA's complaint Salt Association hits back at 'Sid the Slug' campaign
 FSA ASA throws out complaint against Agency 12 October 2004
 FSA Complaint against Food Standards Agency ad campaign thrown out by ASA 12 October 2004

Fictional gastropods
Public service announcement characters
Edible salt
Public information films
Health campaigns
2004 films
2000s educational films
Male characters in advertising
British educational films